Crane Creek Township is one of twenty-five townships in Barry County, Missouri, United States. As of the 2000 census, its population was 923.

Crane Creek Township was organized in 1848, and named for nearby Crane Creek.

Geography
The unincorporated community of Scholten, Missouri lies within its boundaries. It contains two cemeteries: Hilton and Mars Hill.

The stream of East Fork Jenkins Creek runs through this township.

References

 USGS Geographic Names Information System (GNIS)

External links
 US-Counties.com
 City-Data.com

Townships in Barry County, Missouri
Townships in Missouri